

Bacterial diseases

Fungal diseases

Nematodes, Parasitic

Virus and virus-like diseases

References 

 Common Names of Diseases, The American Phytopathological Society

Maize